Varius is a Latin word meaning "diverse", "different", "changeable", "various" or "variegated" and may refer to:

 Varius (moth), a genus of moths belonging to the small family Nepticulidae
 Varius Manx, a Polish pop group
 XKO Varius, a web content management system
 Lucius Varius Rufus, a Roman poet
 Sextus Varius Marcellus, Syro-Roman politician, husband of Julia Soaemias and probably father of Emperor Elagabalus
 Varius Avitus Bassianus, the birth name of the emperor best known as Elagabalus

See also
 Various (disambiguation)